Brio is a Slovenian pay TV channel targeting female viewers 18–34. It was launched by Pro Plus as Pop Brio in September 2010 and replaced the former TV Pika.

BRIO was a part of the first Slovenian subscription package, Pop Non Stop, which launched in September 2011. Six channels were offered in the package: Pop Kino, Pop Kino2, Pop Brio, Pop Fani, Pop Oto, and Pop Spot. In 2013, the package was discontinued along with the Kino2, Fani, and Spot channels; the other three became free-to-view.

In 2014, Pop Brio became known as Brio.

Current programming

Internationally created series

Internationally created Telenovelas

Coming Soon
 Molly of Denali

Past Programming

Nationally created Series / Shows

Internationally created series

Internationally created Telenovelas

Internationally created shows

See also

Pro Plus d.o.o.
POP TV
Kanal A
OTO
KINO

External links

POP BRIO at LyngSat Address

Television channels and stations established in 2010
Television channels in Slovenia
Mass media in Ljubljana
Central European Media Enterprises